\This is a list of the best-selling singles in 2013 in Japan, physical sales are taken from Oricon. Digital sales are taken from the certifications of RIAJ in 2013. A single usually has an A-side song and a B-side song, or more, digit sales count them up.

See also
List of Oricon number-one singles of 2013

References

2013 in Japanese music
2013
Oricon
Japanese music-related lists